WBSC-LP (102.3 FM) is a radio station licensed to serve the community of Bamberg, South Carolina. The station is owned by Rising High Foundation. It airs an oldies music format.

The station was assigned the WBSC-LP call letters by the Federal Communications Commission on April 23, 2014.

References

External links
Official Website

BSC-LP
BSC-LP
Radio stations established in 2015
2015 establishments in South Carolina
Oldies radio stations in the United States
Bamberg County, South Carolina